The National Humanitarian Party was a minor Australian political party that contested the 1983 federal election in Queensland, running one candidate for the House of Representatives and a team for the Senate.

References

Defunct political parties in Australia